Margaret Eliott of Redheugh is the 29th Clan Chief of Clan Elliot.  The daughter of the Elliot Clan's late hereditary Chief, Sir Arthur Eliott, 11th Baronet of Stobs and Laird of Redheugh the ancient seat of the Clan Elliot Chiefs.

See also
Clan Eliott
Elliot Clan Society (website)

References

Scottish clans
Living people
Year of birth missing (living people)
Place of birth missing (living people)